Elections to the Wigan council were held on Thursday, 2 May 1991, with one third scheduled for re-election. Like the last election, this seen a wider variety of party candidates than most previous, but only marginally improved upon the nadir of the year before in terms of candidates, with four wards uncontested (the record low until beaten last year), Conservatives fighting just above one half of the seats and the Liberal Democrats just under - although the Lib Dems near doubled last year's total, both were historically disappointing. Minor party participation consisted of three Independent Labour candidates - including a former Beech Hill Labour councillor - two Liberals, a return of an Independent in Hindley Green and one remaining Green - their lowest fielded when participating - in Atherton.

Results on the night largely turned out to be the converse of the 1988 election with Labour suffering a significant fall in their vote share, mostly to the advantage of the Lib Dems, as they decisively won back second place. There were three gains in total, with two Lib Dem gains from Labour and one vice versa. The Lib Dems achieved a notable gain in the unblemished Labour ward of Bedford-Astley, as well as a second gain in the once consistently-Labour Beech Hill. Labour managed to return Winstanley to sole Labour representation again, but their total of 18 seats was the lowest accomplished in just under a decade for them. Elsewhere the Conservative's successfully defended Swinley this time around, and the Independent Labour comfortably held Hindley. Turnout fell to a fairly average figure of 34.5%.

Election result

This result had the following consequences for the total number of seats on the Council after the elections:

Ward results

References

1991 English local elections
1991
1990s in Greater Manchester